An icebreaker is a ship designed to move through ice-covered waters.

Icebreaker(s) or Ice Breaker(s) may also refer to:

Film and television 
 Icebreaker (film), 2000 U.S.-American action film
 The Icebreaker (film), 2016 Russian disaster film
 "Ice Breaker", 2004 television episode, see list of The Crocodile Hunter episodes
 "Icebreaker", 1987 television episode, see list of Sledge Hammer! episodes
 Ice Breaker, 2005 documentary film about the Canadian icebreaker CCGS Henry Larsen

Literature
 Icebreaker (novel), a 1983 James Bond novel by John Gardner
 Icebreaker (Suvorov), a 1987 military history book by Victor Suvorov
 Icebreaker, an autobiography by Rudy Galindo with Eric Marcus
 Icebreaker, the 2013 first novel in the Hidden series by Lian Tanner
 ICEBreaker, in cyberpunk literature, software designed to break through Intrusion Countermeasures Electronics

Music
 Icebreaker (band), a UK new music ensemble
 The Icebreaker, a 1998 EP by Cursive, or the title song, "Icebreakers"
 "Icebreaker" (song), a 2016 song by Agnete Johnsen

Sports
 Icebreakers (ice hockey team), a charity hockey team of Swedish NHL players
 Chesapeake Icebreakers, a defunct American minor-league hockey team
 Ice Breaker Road Race, an annual foot race in Great Falls, Montana, US
 Ice Breaker Tournament, an annual American college ice hockey event

Video games
 Icebreaker (video game), a 1995 strategy/action game
 Ice Breaker (video game), a 2009 computer puzzle game
 Icebreaker: A Viking Voyage, a 2013 IOS version of the 2009 game

Other uses
 Icebreaker (clothing), a New Zealand clothing brand
 Icebreaker (facilitation), a social activity
 Ice Breaker (roller coaster), a planned roller coaster at SeaWorld Orlando, Florida, US
 Ice Breakers candy, a brand of mints and chewing gum
 Icebreaker Glacier, Antarctica

See also
 
 Eisbrecher, a German dance-metal band
 Break the Ice (disambiguation)
 Breaking the Ice (disambiguation)